The EAR 31 class was a class of oil-burning  gauge  steam locomotives. The 46 members of the class were built in 1955 by Vulcan Foundry, in Newton-le-Willows, Lancashire (now part of Merseyside), England, for the East African Railways (EAR).  They were a lighter, branch-line version of the EAR 30 class, and worked from various sheds throughout the EAR system.

Class list
The numbers and names of each member of the class were as follows:

See also
History of rail transport in Tanzania
Rail transport in Kenya
Rail transport in Uganda

References

Notes

Bibliography

East African Railways locomotives
Metre gauge steam locomotives
Railway locomotives introduced in 1955
Steam locomotives of Kenya
Steam locomotives of Tanzania
Steam locomotives of Uganda
Vulcan Foundry locomotives
2-8-4 locomotives
1′D2′ h2 locomotives